James McCarthy (born 5 January 1999) is a Welsh rugby union player who plays as a wing or fullback.

Early life
McCarthy was born in Newport, Wales to an Irish father and a Welsh mother. He attended Caerleon Comprehensive School and Newport High School. He had been part of the Bristol Rovers academy and began playing rugby union aged 12, going on to represent Wales at under-18 schools level and scoring two tries in their win against Ireland under-18 schools in 2017, as well as being a member of the Newport Gwent Dragons academy.

Move to Ireland
Following his performances in his native Wales, McCarthy, who had been identified through the Irish Exiles pathway, was contacted by the Irish Rugby Football Union, who offered him a place in Munster's academy. McCarthy spent two seasons with the province, featuring for their 'A' team on a number of occasions, and earning five caps for Ireland under-20s and playing against Wales, before opting to return to Wales in April 2019.

Return to Wales
McCarthy rejoined Dragons upon his return to Wales, and was called up to the Wales Sevens squad in January 2020. Because McCarthy never played for Ireland Wolfhounds, Ireland's designated 'capture' team, he remained eligible for Wales selection. He was released by the Dragons at the end of the 2019–20 season.

References

External links
Dragons Profile
Munster Academy Profile

1999 births
Living people
Cross Keys RFC players
Dragons RFC players
People educated at Caerleon Comprehensive School
People educated at Newport High School
Rugby union fullbacks
Rugby union players from Newport, Wales
Rugby union wings
UL Bohemians R.F.C. players
Welsh rugby union players